Otto I (c. 950 – 4 November 1004), called Otto of Worms, a member of the Salian dynasty, was Duke of Carinthia from 978 to 985 and again from 1002 until his death.

Biography
Otto was the only son of Conrad the Red, Duke of Lotharingia, and Liutgarde of Saxony, daughter of Emperor Otto I. His mother died three years after he was born and Otto lived much of his early life in his grandfather's court till his death in 973. His maternal uncle, Otto II, ascended the Imperial throne.

Otto of Worms is first documented as a count in the Nahegau about 956, he also held the Speyergau and Wormsgau, as well as several other counties in the area. In 978, his uncle Emperor Otto II appointed him Carinthian duke and Margrave of Verona, after his Luitpolding predecessor Henry the Younger had unsuccessfully rebelled against the Imperial authority during the War of the Three Henries and was deposed. In 985 however, Emperor Otto's widow Theophanu, in order to gain support for the succession of her minor son Otto III, restored Carinthia to the Luitpoldings, and Otto again lost his duchy. He could at least retain the ducal title as "Duke of Worms", received the Kaiserpfalz of Lautern and seized large estates of Wissembourg (Weißenburg) Abbey in compensation.

Upon the death of Duke Henry II of Bavaria in 995, Otto received the Duchy of Carinthia and the March of Verona back. When Emperor Otto III had died in 1002, Otto of Worms and Henry IV of Bavaria were candidates for the election as King of the Romans; Otto withdrew and received the Duchy of Carinthia from the newly elected king Henry (then Henry II of Germany) in return. Nevertheless, he was forced to cede his Rhenish possessions to his long-time rival Bishop Burchard of Worms.

Otto died two years later, he was succeeded as Carinthian duke by his son, Conrad.

Family
Otto married Judith (died 991), probably a granddaughter of Duke Arnulf the Bad of Bavaria. They had the following known children:
 Henry of Speyer (died before 1000), Count in the Wormsgau
 Pope Gregory V (died 999)
 Conrad I, Duke of Carinthia (1004–1011)
 William, Bishop of Strasbourg (1028–1047)

Notes

References

Sources

950s births
1004 deaths
Year of birth uncertain
Dukes of Carinthia
Salian dynasty
10th-century rulers in Europe
11th-century rulers in Europe